Tiscali TV may refer to:
 Tiscali TV (Italy) - Italian IPTV service by Tiscali Italia
 Tiscali TV (UK) - British IPTV service by Tiscali UK

See also 
 Tiscali (disambiguation)